Bathycolpodes is an Afrotropial genus of moths in the family Geometridae.

Species
 Bathycolpodes acoelopa Prout, 1912
 Bathycolpodes acutissima Herbulot, 1986
 Bathycolpodes anisotes Prout, 1912
 Bathycolpodes bassa Herbulot, 1986
 Bathycolpodes chloronesis Prout, 1930
 Bathycolpodes excavata Warren, 1898
 Bathycolpodes explanata Herbulot, 1986
 Bathycolpodes holochroa Prout, 1915
 Bathycolpodes implumis Prout, 1930
 Bathycolpodes kabaria Swinhoe, 1904
 Bathycolpodes marginata (Warren, 1897)
 Bathycolpodes melanceuthes Prout, 1922
 Bathycolpodes parexplanata Karisch & Hoppe, 2010
 Bathycolpodes pectinata Herbulot, 1992
 Bathycolpodes perdistincta Herbulot, 2003
 Bathycolpodes roehrichti Karisch, 2010
 Bathycolpodes scheeli Karisch & Hoppe, 2010
 Bathycolpodes semigrisea Warren, 1897
 Bathycolpodes subferrata  Prout, 1930 
 Bathycolpodes subfuscata Warren, 1902
 Bathycolpodes torniflorata Prout, 1917
 Bathycolpodes vegeta Prout, 1912
 Bathycolpodes vuattouxi Herbulot, 1972

References
 Bathycolpodes at Markku Savela's Lepidoptera and Some Other Life Forms
Natural History Museum Lepidoptera genus database

Geometrinae
Geometridae genera